M. V. Lomonosov Moscow State University (MSU) is a public research university in Moscow, Russia, and the most prestigious university in the country.

The university includes 15 research institutes, 43 faculties, more than 300 departments, and six branches (including five foreign ones in the Commonwealth of Independent States countries). Alumni of the university include past leaders of the Soviet Union and other governments. As of 2019, 13 Nobel laureates, six Fields Medal winners, and one Turing Award winner had been affiliated with the university.

The university was ranked 18th by The Three University Missions Ranking in 2022, and 76th by the QS World University Rankings in 2022, #293 in the world by the global Times Higher World University Rankings, and #326 by U.S. News & World Report in 2022. It was the highest-ranking Russian educational institution by QS in 2020, and according to the Nature Index in 2019 the highest ranked Russian university for research output. Moscow State University is generally accepted as the leading higher educational institution in the former Soviet Union.

History

Imperial Moscow University

Saint Petersburg State University and MSU each claim to be Russia's oldest university. Though Moscow State University was founded in 1755, St. Petersburg which has had a continuous existence as a "university" since 1819 sees itself as the successor of an academy established on in 1724, by a decree of Peter the Great.

MSU originally occupied the Principal Medicine Store on Red Square from 1755 to 1787. Catherine the Great transferred the university to a building on the other side of Mokhovaya Street, constructed between 1782 and 1793, to a design by Matvei Kazakov, and rebuilt by Domenico Giliardi after fire consumed much of Moscow in 1812.

In the 18th century, the university had three departments: philosophy, medicine, and law. A preparatory college was affiliated with the university until its abolition in 1812. In 1779, Mikhail Kheraskov founded a boarding school for noblemen (Благородный пансион) which in 1830 became a gymnasium for Russian nobility. The university press, run by Nikolay Novikov in the 1780s, published the newspaper in Imperial Russia: Moskovskie Vedomosti.

In 1804, medical education split into clinical (therapy), surgical, and obstetrics faculties. During 1884–97, the Department of Medicine built a medical campus in Devichye Pole, between the Garden Ring and Novodevichy Convent; designed by Konstantin Bykovsky, with university doctors like Nikolay Sklifosovskiy and Fyodor Erismann acting as consultants. The campus, and medical education in general, were separated from Moscow University in 1930. Devichye Pole was operated by the independent I.M. Sechenov First Moscow State Medical University and by various other state and private institutions.

The roots of student unrest in the university reach deep into the nineteenth century. In 1905, a social-democratic organization emerged at the university and called for the overthrow of the Czarist government and the establishment of a republic in Russia. The imperial government repeatedly threatened to close the university. In 1911, in a protest over the introduction of troops onto the campus and mistreatment of certain professors, 130 scientists and professors resigned en masse, including Nikolay Dimitrievich Zelinskiy, Pyotr Nikolaevich Lebedev, and Sergei Alekseevich Chaplygin; thousands of students were expelled.

Moscow State University

1917-49
After the October Revolution of 1917, the institution began to admit children of the proletariat and peasantry. In 1919, the university abolished tuition fees, and established a preparatory facility to help working-class children prepare for entrance examinations. During the implementation of Joseph Stalin's first five-year plan (1928–32), prisoners from the Gulag were forced to construct parts of the newly expanded university.

1950-99

In 1970, the university imposed a 2% quota on Jewish students. A 2014 article entitled "Math as a tool of anti-semitism" in The Mathematics Enthusiast discussed antisemitism in the Moscow State University’s Department of Mathematics during the 1970s and 1980s.

In the mid-1980s, the Dean of MSU's law faculty was dismissed for taking bribes. After 1991, nine new faculties were established. The following year, the university gained a unique status: it is funded directly from the state budget (bypassing the Ministry of Education).

On 6 September 1997, French electronic musician Jean Michel Jarre used the front of the university as the backdrop for a concert. The concert attracted a paying crowd of half a million people.

2000-present

In 2007, MSU Rector Viktor Sadovnichy said that corruption in Russia's education system was a "systemic illness," and that he had seen an ad guaranteeing a perfect score on entrance exams to MSU, for a significant fee.

On 19 March 2008, Russia's most powerful supercomputer to date, the SKIF MSU (skif means "Scythian" in Russian) was launched at the university. Its peak performance of 60 TFLOPS (LINPACK - 47.170 TFLOPS) made it the fastest supercomputer in the Commonwealth of Independent States.

In November 2012, Mikhail Basharatyan, Deputy Dean of the MSU World Economy Department, was fired for taking a bribe from a pupil. In February 2013, Andrei Andriyanov resigned as head of the Kolmogorov Special Educational and Scientific Center of the university, after an investigation concluded that he had included fake references in his doctoral thesis.

In March 2022, Victor Sadovnichy, rector of Moscow State University and president of the Russian Union of Rectors, was the lead signature in a public statement endorsing the 2022 Russian invasion of Ukraine. In reaction, Academia Europaea, a pan-European academy, suspended the membership of Sadovnichy. In response to the Russian invasion, that same month Yale University, the Hamburg University of Applied Sciences, University of Potsdam, and HKU Business School suspended their longstanding relationships with the university, and the University of St Andrews suspended a joint master’s degree programme with the university. Intel and AMD, the largest chip manufacturers in the world, whose processors are used in the Moscow State University supercomputer, as well as NVIDIA, reacted by suspending deliveries of their processors to Russia.

Campus

Since 1953, most of the faculties have been situated on Sparrow Hills, in southwest Moscow. In the post-war era, Joseph Stalin ordered seven tiered neoclassic towers to be built around the city. It was built using Gulag labour, as were many of Stalin's Great Construction Projects in Russia. The MSU main building was the tallest building in Europe until 1990. The central tower is 240 m tall, 36 stories high.

Along with the university administration, the Museum of Earth Sciences and faculties of Mechanics and Mathematics, Geology, Geography, and Fine and Performing Arts are in the Main building. The building on Mokhovaya Street houses the Faculty of Journalism, the Faculty of Psychology, and Institute of Asian and African Countries. A number of faculty buildings are located near Manege Square in the centre of Moscow and a number of campuses abroad in Ukraine, Kazakhstan, Tajikistan and Uzbekistan. The Ulyanovsk branch of MSU was reorganized into Ulyanovsk State University in 1996.

Faculties

As of 2009, the university had 39 faculties and 15 research centres. A number of small faculties opened, such as Faculty of Physics and Chemistry and Higher School of Television. The full list of faculties is as follows:
 Faculty of Mechanics and Mathematics
 Faculty of Computational Mathematics and Cybernetics
 Faculty of Physics

 Faculty of Chemistry
 Faculty of Materials Science
 Faculty of Biology
 
 
 
 Faculty of Geography
 Faculty of Fundamental Medicine
 Faculty of History
  
 
 Faculty of Economics
 
 Faculty of Journalism
 Faculty of Psychology
 Institute of Asian and African Countries
 
 
 
 
 Faculty of Political Science
 Faculty of Fine and Performing Arts
 Faculty of Global Studies
 Faculty of Education
 Graduate School of Business Administration
 Faculty of Physics and Chemistry
 Moscow School of Economics
 Higher School of Translation and Interpretation
 Higher School of Public Administration
 Higher School of Public Audit
 Higher School of Administration and Innovations
 Higher School of Innovative Business Administration
 Higher School of Contemporary Social Sciences
 Higher School of Television
 Faculty of Further Education
 Faculty of Military Training

Institutions and research centers 
 Skobeltsyn Institute of Nuclear Physics
 Institute of Mechanics
 Sternberg Astronomical Institute
 A.N. Belozersky Institute of Physico-Chemical Biology
 Research Computing Center
 N.N. Bogolyubov Institute for Theoretical Problems of Microphysics
 White Sea Biological Station
 Moscow University Herbarium

Academic reputation

In world rankings, MSU was ranked 101st–150th by the Academic Ranking of World Universities 2022, #75 by QS World University Rankings 2023, and #335 by U.S. News & World Report 2023.

According to the some international rankings MSU is the highest-ranked Russian university (with the nearest Russian competitor being Saint Petersburg State University), but it was consistently ranked outside the top 5 nationally in 2010–11 by Forbes and Ria Novosti / HSE, with both ratings based on data set collected by HSE from Russian Unified State Exam scores averaged per all students and faculties of university.

The university has contacts with universities in the world, exchanging students and lecturers. It houses the UNESCO International Demography Courses and Hydrology Courses. In 1991 the French University College, the Russian-American University, and the Institute of German Science and Culture were opened.

Staff and students
The university employs more than 4,000 academics and 15,000 support staff. Approximately 5,000 researchers work at the university's research institutes and facilities. More than 40,000 undergraduates and 7,000 advanced degree candidates are enrolled. Annually, the university hosts approximately 2,000 students, graduate students, and researchers from around the world.

Notable people

As of 2017, 13 Nobel laureates, 6 Fields Medal winners and one Turing Award winner had been affiliated with the university. It is the alma mater of writers such as Anton Chekhov, Boris Pasternak, and Ivan Turgenev, politicians such as Mikhail Gorbachev , Mikhail Suslov, and politician and economist Ruslan Khasbulatov , as well as mathematicians and physicists such as Vladimir Arnold, Boris Demidovich, Vladimir Drinfeld, Vitaly Ginzburg, Andrey Kolmogorov, Grigory Margulis, Andrei Sakharov, and Yakov Sinai.

Moscow State University in philately

See also
Education in Russia
List of early modern universities in Europe
List of universities in Russia
List of rectors of Moscow State University
List of honorary professors of the Moscow State University

References

External links

 Moscow State University

 
Buildings and structures built in the Soviet Union
Stalinist architecture
Tourist attractions in Moscow
Public universities and colleges in Russia
1755 establishments in the Russian Empire
Educational institutions established in 1755